Alberto Braglia (23 April 1883 – 5 February 1954) was an Italian gymnast who won three gold medals at the 1908 and 1912 Olympics.

Biography
Braglia started practicing gymnastics in club at age 12. After winning the gold medal at the 1908 Olympics, he suffered a serious shoulder injury while performing in public and fell in a depression due to the death of his 4-year-old son. He recovered by the 1912 Games, where he served as the flag bearer for Italy and won two more gold medals, after which he retired from competitions to perform as an acrobat in circuses. Braglia returned to Olympics 1932 as the coach of Italian gymnastics team.

Braglia died in a Modena medical clinic on 5 February 1954 after suffering a cardiac arrest.

See also
 Legends of Italian sport - Walk of Fame

References

External links
 
 
 
 

Italian male artistic gymnasts
Olympic gold medalists for Italy
Olympic silver medalists for Italy
1883 births
1954 deaths
Olympic gymnasts of Italy
Gymnasts at the 1906 Intercalated Games
Gymnasts at the 1908 Summer Olympics
Gymnasts at the 1912 Summer Olympics
Olympic medalists in gymnastics
Sportspeople from the Province of Modena
Medalists at the 1912 Summer Olympics
Medalists at the 1908 Summer Olympics
Medalists at the 1906 Intercalated Games
Medalists at the World Artistic Gymnastics Championships